Organized Crime is an album from German comedy pop act Mambo Kurt. This album is a compilation album and it is his first album to be released overseas.

Track listing
Thunderstruck (AC/DC)
In The Shadows (The Rasmus) 
Hells Bells (AC/DC)
Sheena Is A Punkrocker (The Ramones)
Anarchy In The UK (Sex Pistols)
Basket Case (Green Day)
Prince Of The Rodeo (Turbonegro)
The Number Of The Beast (Iron Maiden)
Engel (Rammstein)
Killing An Arab (The Cure)
I Was Made For Loving You (KISS)
The Final Countdown (Europe)
Sunshine Reggae (Laid Back) (bonus track)

References 

Covers albums
2005 albums
Mambo Kurt albums